Alan Slim (born 19 December 1984) is a Mexican actor.

Biography 
Slim,  a distant relative of magnate Carlos Slim, was born in Mexicali, Baja California, Mexico. He studied acting at the Centro de Educación Artística of Televisa. He graduated as a psychologist, but does not practice.

Filmography

References

External links 
 

1984 births
Living people
21st-century Mexican male actors
Mexican male telenovela actors
Mexican male television actors